Oudendijk is a village in the Dutch province of North Holland.

History 
The village was first mentioned in 1423 or 1424 as "binnen den Ban van Oudendyc", and means "old dike". Oudendijk developed along the dike in the 12th century. During the 13th century, the peat around to the north was excavated.

The Dutch Reformed church is a single aisled church with ridge turret which was built in 1649 to replace a 15th century church.

Oudendijk was home to 346 people in 1840. It was a separate municipality between 1817 and 1979, when the new municipality of Wester-Koggenland was created. In 2007, it became part of the municipality of Koggenland.

Gallery

References

Former municipalities of North Holland
Populated places in North Holland
Koggenland